Kelly Ward (born November 17, 1956) is an American actor and voice director for television animation. He is most famous for his role as T-Bird Putzie in Grease (1978).

Biography 
Ward was born in San Diego. He is the son of Don and Bonnie Ward, who have been active in theatre in San Diego for decades. His brother is the actor Kirby Ward.

He first gained national attention as a character in the television film The Boy in the Plastic Bubble, which starred John Travolta as the title character. The role began a short acting career for Ward; when Travolta was cast in the 1978 film Grease, Ward was cast as Putzie, a character created specifically for the film. Ward mostly stopped appearing on-camera in 1983; he continues to work in the entertainment industry.

Kelly Ward is actively working as a voice director for Disney Television Animation. He has voice directed Mickey Mouse Clubhouse, Jake and the Never Land Pirates, Star vs. the Forces of Evil, and many more.

Ward also teaches musical theatre at the University of Southern California.

Acting career 
 GoBots: Battle of the Rock Lords (1986) – Fitor (voice)
 Challenge of the GoBots (1984) – Fitor (voice)
 Magnum, P.I. (TV series)
 "The Big Blow" (1983) – Lou Blassingame
 Quincy M.E. (TV series)
 "Next Stop, Nowhere" (1982) – Skip
 Into the Murdering Mind (1982) – Glenn Werner
 Bret Maverick (TV series)
 "The Not So Magnificent Six" (1982) – Willie Trueblood
 Zoot Suit (1981) – Thomas 'Tommy' Roberts
 The Big Red One (1980) – Pvt. Johnson, 1st Squad
 M*A*S*H (TV series)
 "Dear Uncle Abdul" (1979) – Dave
 The Waltons (TV series)
 "The Violated" (1979) – Frank Thatcher
 Grease (1978) – Putzie
 Deadman's Curve (1978 TV movie) – Billy
 CHiPs (TV series) – Doug
 The Boy in the Plastic Bubble (1976 TV movie) – Tom Shuster

Screenwriting credits

Television 
 Challenge of the GoBots (1985)
 Wildfire (1986)
 Sky Commanders (1987)
 Popeye and Son (1987)
 Fantastic Max (1988)
 The Completely Mental Misadventures of Ed Grimley (1988)
 The Further Adventures of SuperTed (1989)
 The Pirates of Dark Water (1991)
 Voltron: The Third Dimension (1998–2000)
 The New Woody Woodpecker Show (1999)
 Horrible Histories (2001–2002)
 Butt-Ugly Martians (2002)
 Liberty's Kids (2002–2003)
 Trollz (2005)
 Firehouse Tales (2005-2006)
 Jakers! The Adventures of Piggley Winks (2004–2006)
 Wow! Wow! Wubbzy! (2006)
 Crime Time (2008)
 Mickey Mouse Clubhouse (2008, 2012)
 Jake and the Never Land Pirates (2011–2012)
 Mickey Mouse Mixed-Up Adventures (2021)

Film 
 Once Upon a Forest (1993)
 All Dogs Go to Heaven 2 (1996)

Works 
 The Note Hunter: The Case of the Haunted Swamp (The Cases of The Note Hunter Book 1)

External links 
 

1956 births
Living people
American voice directors
Male actors from San Diego
American male voice actors
American male telenovela actors
American male film actors
20th-century American male actors
American animated film directors
University of Southern California faculty